The Dark Eye: Book of Heroes is a role-playing video game developed by Finnish studio Random Potion and published by Wild River Games for Microsoft Windows.  It is set in the world of The Dark Eye by Ulisses Spiele. The game was released on 9 June 2020, and received mostly average to negative reviews, though it was said to be quite an accurate representation of the tabletop role-playing experience of The Dark Eye.

References

2020 video games
Cooperative video games
Fantasy video games
Multiplayer and single-player video games
Role-playing video games
Video games based on tabletop role-playing games
Video games developed in Finland
Windows games
Windows-only games